Dual wielding is the technique of using two weapons, one in each hand for training or combat. It is not a common combat practice. Although historical records of dual wielding in war are limited, there are numerous weapon-based martial arts that involve the use of a pair of weapons. The use of a companion weapon is sometimes employed in European martial arts and fencing, such as a parrying dagger. Miyamoto Musashi, a Japanese swordsman and ronin, was said to have conceived of the idea of a particular style of swordsmanship involving the use of two swords.

In terms of firearms, especially handguns, dual wielding is generally denounced by firearm enthusiasts due to its impracticality. Though using two handguns at the same time confers an advantage by allowing more ready ammunition, it is rarely done due to other aspects of weapons handling. Dual wielding, both with melee and ranged weapons, has been popularized by fictional works (film, television, and video games).

History

Dual wielding has not been used or mentioned much in military history, though it appears in weapon-based martial arts and fencing practices. 

Dimachaerus were a type of Roman gladiator that fought with two swords. The name is the Latin-language borrowing of the Greek word  meaning "bearing two knives" (di- dual + machairi knife) Thus, an inscription from Lyon, France, mentions such a type of gladiator, here spelled dymacherus. The dimachaeri were equipped for close-combat fighting. A dimachaerus used a pair of siccae (curved scimitar) or gladius and used a fighting style adapted to both attack and defend with his weapons rather than a shield, as he was not equipped with one. 

The use of weapon combinations in each hand has been mentioned for close combat in western Europe during the Byzantine, Medieval, and Renaissance era. The use of a parrying dagger such as a main gauche along with a rapier is common in historical European martial arts. 

North American Indian tribes of the Atlantic northeast used a form involving a tomahawk in the primary hand and a knife in the secondary. It is practiced today as part of the modern Cree martial art Okichitaw.

All the above-mentioned examples, involve either one long and one short weapon, or two short weapons.  An example of a dual wield of two sabres is the Ukrainian cossack dance hopak.

Asia 
During the campaign Muslim conquest in 6th to 7th century AD, a Rashidun caliphate general named Khalid ibn Walid was reported to favor wielding two broad swords, with one in each hand, during combat.

Traditional schools of Japanese martial arts include dual wield techniques, particularly a style conceived by Miyamoto Musashi involving the katana and wakizashi, two-sword kenjutsu techniques he called Niten Ichi-ryū. Eskrima, the traditional martial arts of the Philippines teaches Doble Baston techniques involving the basic use of a pair of rattan sticks and also Espada y daga or Sword/Stick and Dagger. Okinawan martial arts have a method that uses a pair of sai.  

Chinese martial arts involve the use of a pair of butterfly swords and hook swords. 

Famed for his enormous strength, Dian Wei, a military general serving under the warlord Cao Cao in the late Eastern Han dynasty of China, excelled at wielding a pair of ji (a halberd-like weapon), each of which was said to weigh 40 jin.

During Wei–Jie war, Ran Min, emperor of the short-lived Ran Wei empire of China, wielded two weapons, one in each hand, and fought fiercely, inflicting many casualties on the Xianbei soldiers while mounted on the famous horse Zhu Long ("Red Dragon").

Gatka, a weapon-based martial art from the Punjab region, is known to use two sticks at a time. 

The Thailand weapon-based martial art Krabi Krabong involves the use of a separate Krabi in each hand. 

Kalaripayattu teaches advanced students to use either two sticks (of various sizes) or two daggers or two swords, simultaneously.

Modern 
The use of a gun in each hand is often associated with the American Old West, mainly due to media portrayals. It was common for people in the era to carry two guns, but not to use them at the same time, as shown in movies. The second gun served as a backup weapon, to be used only if the main one suffered a malfunction or was lost or emptied.

However, there were several examples of gunmen in the West who actually used two pistols at the same time in their gunfights: 
 John Wesley Hardin killed a gunman named Benjamin Bradley who shot at him, by drawing both of his pistols and firing back.
 The Mexican vaquero Augustine Chacon had several gunfights in which he was outnumbered by more than one gunman and prevailed by equipping himself with a revolver in each hand.
 King Fisher once managed to kill three bandits in a shootout by pulling both of his pistols.
 During the infamous Four Dead in Five Seconds Gunfight, lawman Dallas Stoudenmire pulled both of his pistols as he ran out onto the street and killed one bystander and two other gunmen.
 Jonathan R. Davis, a prospector during the California Gold Rush, was ambushed by thirteen outlaws while together with two of his comrades. One of his friends was killed and the other was mortally wounded during the ambush. Davis drew both of his revolvers and fired, killing seven of the bandits, and killing four more with his bowie knife, causing the final two to flee.

Dual wielding two handguns has been popularized by film and television.

Effectiveness
MythBusters compared many firing stances, including having a gun in each hand and found that, compared to the two-handed single-gun stance as a benchmark, only the one-handed shoulder-level stance with a single gun was comparable in terms of accuracy and speed. The ability to look down the sights of the gun was given as the main reason for this. In an episode the following year, they compared holding two guns and firing simultaneously—rather than alternating left and right shots—with holding one gun in the two-handed stance, and found that the results were in favor of using two guns and firing simultaneously.

In media
 The Teenage Mutant Ninja Turtles features dual wielding being done by Leonardo with two katana swords, Raphael with two sais, and Michelangelo with two nunchucks. Sometimes, their arch enemy known as the Shredder dual wields with many weapons.
 Princess Mononoke features Lady Eboshi dual wielding with a katana sword and a hairpin.
 The Marvel Comics features dual wielding being done by Deadpool with two katana swords, Nightcrawler with two sabres, Elektra with two sais, and Black Widow with two pistols and two batons.
 The DC Comics features Dick Grayson and Barbara Gordon dual wielding two bastons. 
 The Star Wars franchise features many characters dual wielding two lightsabres or more including Anakin Skywalker, Ahsoka Tano, and General Grievous. Star Wars: The Clone Wars features Palpatine and his former apprentice, Darth Maul, dual wielding two lightsabres each.
 The Chronicles of Narnia: The Lion, the Witch and the Wardrobe features the noble centaur general Oreius dual wielding two longswords, and also the oppressive White Witch doing the same. It also features the Minotaur general Otmin dual wielding a falchion sword and a battle axe. 
 Ip Man 3 features butterfly swords being dual wielded by Ip Man and Cheung Tin-chi.
 The Hobbit and The Lord of the Rings features the virtuous wizard Gandalf dual wielding a magic staff and a mystic longsword.
 The Mummy Returns features the adventurous Egyptologist Evelyn O'Connell and the treacherous Anck-su-namun dual wielding two sais. 
 The Pirates of the Caribbean features characters dual wielding two swords including Jack Sparrow, Will Turner, and Elizabeth Swann.
 The martial arts movie Crouching Tiger, Hidden Dragon features Michelle Yeoh as Yu Shu Lien dual wielding with a dao sword which split to two, and then with two hook swords. 
 The Three Musketeers features many characters dual fighting with rapiers and daggers.
 Mighty Morphin Power Rangers features Tommy Oliver dual wielding a sword and a dagger.
 Robin of Sherwood features Nasir, a Saracen assassin who dual wields two scimitars.
 Avatar: The Legend of Aang features dual wielding done by Zuko with two dao swords, Jet with two hook swords, Suki with two war fans, and Sokka with a machete along a club or a boomerang.     
 The Transformers features dual wielding being done by many characters including Optimus Prime and Optimus Primal with two swords.
 Kung Fu Hustle features iron rings being dual wielded by the humble tailor of Pigsty Alley.
 Power Rangers: Jungle Fury features dual wielding being done by Casey Rhodes with two nunchakus and also two dao-themed Shark Sabres, Theo Martin with two tonfas and then two tessan-themed Jungle Fans, and Camille with two sais.
 In the Marvel Cinematic Universe martial arts film Shang Chi and the Legend of the Ten Rings features the Ten Rings be dual wielded by Wenwu, the MCU version of the Mandarin, and then by Shang Chi, his son. 
 The musical version of The Lion King features Mufasa and his son Simba dual wielding two akrafena swords to fight.
 Lara Croft, the heroine of the Tomb Raider'' franchise dual wields two pistols.

See also
 Dimachaerus
 Gun fu
 Swordsmanship

References

Combat
Video game terminology